2011–13 Liga Indonesia Third Division is the 8th season of Liga Indonesia Third Division. The competition began in November 2011 and completed on 13 March 2013.

Jember United won the Third Division title after defeating PS Gianyar.

Province stage
The whole match was held at the provincial level involving clubs in the province. Competition held to determine the qualifying event for the provincial representative to the regional level. The competition is divided into 33 provinces and managed by the respective Provincial Football Association. The competition began in November 2011 and completed in September 2012.

Region stage
The whole match was held at the regional level involving top clubs from each province who are in the region. Competition conducted for qualifying event leading to the national level. The competition is divided into seven regions and is managed by the Indonesian Amateur League Board (BLAI). The competition began in January 2013 and completed on 4 March 2013.

Knockout stage
Participate is 7 region winner from region stage. The competition began on 8 March 2013 and completed on 13 March 2013.

Qualify teams
Sumatra region: PS Belitung Timur
Java region I (Central Java/East Java/Yogyakarta): Jember United
Java region II (Jakarta Capital Region/Banten/West Java): PS UNI Bandung
Borneo region: Persemas F.C.
Lesser Sunda Islands region (Bali/NTB/NTT): PS Gianyar
Celebes region: PS Bone Bolango
East region (Maluku/North Maluku/Papua): Persiyali Yalimo

Knockout Phase

SEMIFINALS

FINAL

Champions

Notes

External links
 Website of the PSSI's Board for Amateur Leagues

Liga Indonesia Third Division seasons
5
5